WZID (95.7 FM) is an American radio station with an adult contemporary format.  WZID is located on Commercial Street in Manchester, New Hampshire.  Its signal can be heard as far south as the Massachusetts Turnpike, as far east as southern Maine and as far west as Vermont. WZID also broadcasts in HD Radio.

History
The station signed on October 2, 1947, as WKBR-FM. Throughout the 1960s, and very early 1970s, WKBR-FM simulcast the top 40 format of WKBR 1250 (now WGAM), providing that station with significant extended coverage. In July 1971, WKBR-FM became WZID, and the format was flipped to beautiful music.  In the 1980s, instrumental easy listening music was scaled back, with soft vocal hits added, to the point where the station evolved into an adult contemporary station.  In October 1990, Sunshine Broadcasting of New Hampshire Inc. announced the sale of WZID and 1370 WFEA (AM) to Saga Communications Inc. of Grosse Pointe Farms, Michigan. The sale was finalized April 16, 1991. Saga Communications of New England LLC operates the station today. WZID's president and general manager is Bob Cox.

Translators

WZID used to be heard on translator station, W270AH 101.9 in Peterborough, New Hampshire. However in 2008, Saga Communications filed a series of minor translator applications which moved the translator into the Keene radio market as W276CB, a translator of Saga radio station WKNE's HD3 channel as "Kool 103.1" (now WINQ-FM's HD2 channel as "WINK Classic Country 103.1FM").

Up until mid-January 2009, WZID had two more translators, W231BR 94.1 in Manchester at 250 watts and W276BJ 103.1 in Concord, also at 250 watts, but in January 2009 those two translators were turned into the new "Hot Hits 94.1 and 103.1", a simulcast of WZID's HD2 channel, which is a top 40 station broadcasting Dial Global's Hits Now! format; branding themselves as the new hit music station in New Hampshire. Saga Communications obviously had been planning this out for some time because both the translators' power were recently increased from low power to 250 watts. This station was a direct competitor to Manchester’s heritage CHR 105.5 WJYY, but had an inferior signal compared to it. Saga was able to open up this new station due to a loophole in the Federal Communications Commission (FCC) rules that allows HD sub-channel stations to be repeated on translators. On December 11, 2013, Hot Hits had short-lived intentions of increasing the HAAT of W231BR up to 270 meters to provide significant coverage improvements to the Keene, Portsmouth and Lowell areas; however, this signal upgrade had never occurred.

Beginning in mid July 2015, WZID began simulcasting sister station WFEA on its HD3 channel which in turn is broadcast on newly purchased 110-watt translator W260CF serving the greater Manchester area from its tower on Mt. Uncanoonuc in Goffstown at 99.9 FM. On February 1, 2017, WZID's HD3 sub channel changed their format from the WFEA simulcast to classic country, branded as "103.1 The Outlaw", as it replaced "Hot Hits" on W276BJ 103.1 FM in Concord. In January 2020, Saga acquired a second translator, W295BL 106.9 FM in Manchester, to carry "The Outlaw".

On November 23, 2018, WZID's HD2 subchannel changed its format from top 40 to classic hits, branded as "Rewind 94.1".

References

External links

ZID
Manchester, New Hampshire
Hillsborough County, New Hampshire
Radio stations established in 1947
Mainstream adult contemporary radio stations in the United States
1947 establishments in New Hampshire